Haddal is a settlement in Ulstein municipality in Møre og Romsdal county. Haddal is located about 9 kilometers south of the municipal center Ulsteinvik.

References

Ulstein
Villages in Møre og Romsdal